Michał Żuk (born 2 January 2009) is a Spanish footballer who plays as a midfielder for Pogoń Szczecin.

Early life
Born in Catalonia, Spain, to Polish parents from the Zamość region, Żuk grew up in Girona, starting his career with Aqua Hotel, where he scored 27 goals in 16 games as a midfielder. This caught the eye of Spanish giants Barcelona, and he joined the Catalan club's La Masia academy in 2016.

Żuk progressed well through Barcelona's youth ranks, racking up over 400 goals by the time he was eleven. He was seen as one of Barcelona's biggest young prospects.

In June 2022, Michał and his brother Miłosz moved to Pogoń Szczecin due to their parents relocating to Poland.

International career
Though born in Spain, Żuk is also eligible to represent his father's native Poland. During a November 2021 visit to the Poland national football team's training, Żuk and his brother, Miłosz, discussed the possibility of representing Poland's youth international teams in the future with president of the Polish FA, Cezary Kulesza.

Style of play
Noted for his superior technical ability, especially his exceptional ball control and excellent vision, Żuk has been compared to former Spanish great, and Barcelona legend, Andrés Iniesta. As with most talented dribblers to come out of Barcelona's youth academy in recent years, he has also been compared to Argentine football legend Lionel Messi.

Personal life

Family
Żuk's brother, Miłosz, is also a footballer, and was playing for the youth team of Girona. Miłosz currently also plays for Pogoń Szczecin.

Sponsorship
In 2018, Żuk signed a sponsorship deal with German company Adidas. In doing so, he became one of the youngest athletes to have signed a deal with the sporting goods manufacturer.

References

External links

2009 births
Living people
Footballers from Catalonia
Spanish footballers
Polish footballers
Spanish people of Polish descent
Association football midfielders
FC Barcelona players
Pogoń Szczecin players